Quo graviora could refer to one of two papal documents:

 Quo graviora (1825) an apostolic constitution issued by Pope Leo XII prohibiting membership in Masonic lodges
 Quo graviora (1833) an encyclical issued by Pope Gregory XVI addressed to the bishops of Rhineland